Nicholas Zsámboki was a palatine of the Kingdom of Hungary in the 14th century. He was appointed in 1342. He left his position in 1356 to hand it over to Nicholas Kont, who married his daughter Klara.

References

14th-century Hungarian people
Medieval Croatian nobility
Medieval Hungarian nobility
Palatines of Hungary